Lukas Kragl (born 20 January 1990) is an Austrian footballer who currently plays for Union Dietach.

External links
 

1990 births
Living people
Austrian footballers
LASK players
SC Austria Lustenau players
SKN St. Pölten players
ATSV Stadl-Paura players
FC Wels players
Austria youth international footballers
Association football midfielders